The "Song of the Military and Political University of Resistance Against Japan", also known as the "Military Academy Song", is a patriotic song of the People's Republic of China. It was the anthem of the Counter-Japanese Military and Political University and is the anthem of the present day PLA National Defence University. It is also commonly played during military parades. The lyrics were written by Kai Feng and the music composed by Lu Ji in November 1937.

Lyrics

External links
Orchestral and Choral MP3 Audio from PLA Daily
Orchestral Audio from Xinhua

Mandarin-language songs
Chinese patriotic songs
Songs about Japan